Ruby Jerins is an American actress best known for playing Grace Peyton for seven seasons in the comedy-drama series Nurse Jackie. She started out playing guest star parts on NBC’s Law & Order: SVU and Kidnapped, and then was a recurring character in the ABC series Six Degrees. She played the daughter of Kevin Bacon in the HBO film Taking Chance, and when she was 8, Martin Scorsese cast her opposite Leonardo DiCaprio and Michelle Williams in Shutter Island. She then played Caroline Hawkins in the 2010 film Remember Me opposite Robert Pattinson, Emilie de Ravin, and Pierce Brosnan. After that she booked the highly coveted role of Melanie in Louder Than Bombs, a film by Joachim Trier that was in the main competition at Cannes in 2015. She can be seen in "BLKBX", a music video filmed in several parts featuring Grace Gaustad that promotes self empowerment and healing above bullying for young women.  Jerins studied acting at LaGuardia High School of the Arts in New York City, and went to college at Tulane University.

Life and career
Jerins is the daughter of the artist Edgar Jerins and actress Alana Jerins, and the older sister of Sterling Jerins, an actress who appeared in The Conjuring. Jerins made her acting debut in the film The Wedding in 2001, alongside Jaid Barrymore and Stephen C. Bradbury, playing the flower girl. Jerins has also guest starred in television series such as Kidnapped, Law & Order, Guiding Light, As the World Turns, Six Degrees, and Saturday Night Live. She also had a main role in Nurse Jackie.

In 2010, Jerins played one of the main characters in the film Remember Me, alongside Robert Pattinson and Emilie De Ravin.

Filmography

Awards
 Recanati-Kaplan Excellence in the Arts Scholarship, June 2007.

References

Further reading
 "Robert Pattinson Vs. Leonardo DiCaprio? 'Remember Me' & 'Shutter Island' Star Ruby Jerins Picks Sides", MTV News, March 4, 2010.

External links
 

Living people
American child actresses
American film actresses
American television actresses
21st-century American actresses
Year of birth missing (living people)